Kovalyov, often written as Kovalev, or its feminine variant Kovalyova, Kovaleva, is a common Russian surname, an equivalent of the English surname Smithson (derived from the Ukrainian word koval', which means "blacksmith"). Due to the ambiguous status of the Cyrillic letter yo, the surname may be written with the Cyrillic letter ye (/) instead, though literate Russian speakers always pronounce it yo.

The surname may refer to:
Aleksandr Sergeyevich Kovalyov (b. 1982), Russian footballer
Aleksandr Vladimirovich Kovalyov (b. 1975), Russian sprint canoer
Alexei Kovalev (born 1973), Russian professional ice hockey player
Anton Kovalyov (born 1992), Ukrainian-born Canadian chess grandmaster
Gennady Kovalev (born 1983), Russian boxer
Mikhail Kovalyov (1897–1967), Soviet military leader
Nikolay Kovalyov (politician) (1949–2019), Russian politician, Chair of the State Duma's Veterans' Committee, former head of the Federal Security Service (FSB)
Nikolay Kovalev (fencer) (born 1986), Russian sabre fencer
Oleksii Kovalov (1989–2022), Ukrainian politician
Pasha Kovalev (born 1980), Russian professional Latin and ballroom dancer
Kovalyova is the real surname of a Russian serf actress and opera singer Praskovya Zhemchugova
Sergey Kovalev (born 1983), Russian boxer
Sergei Adamovich Kovalyov (1930–2021), Russian human rights activist and politician, first Commissioner for Human Rights in the Russian Federation (1994–95)
Sergei Nikitich Kovalev (Petrograd, August 15, 1919 – St. Petersburg, February  24, 2011), Russian designer of the U.S.S.R. nuclear submarine
Valentin Kovalyov (born 1944), Russian politician
Valery Kovalev (24 April 1970, Neuruppin, Bezirk Potsdam, East Germany - 31 December 2021, Moscow, Russia) — Russian entrepreneur, philanthropist and Wikipedian.
Vladimir Kovalyov (born 1953), Soviet figure skater
Vladislav Kovalev (born 1994), Belarusian chess grandmaster

In fiction:
Central character of Nicolai Gogol's The Nose

See also
Koval (surname)
Kovalenko, a surname

Surnames of Ukrainian origin
Russian-language surnames